Larsiny or Larsiny Family is an American hip hop group/label from North Philadelphia, Pennsylvania. Rapper Cassidy helped found the crew Larsiny with his home-town- Family Members Cousins A R AB Cal Akbar and Shiz Lansky, who is featured on the song "I Pray" on the B.A.R.S. The Barry Adrian Reese Story album. They got their first break after being signed to the Ruff Ryders in 1998, after being featured on the "Ryde Or Die Boyz" track from the Ryde or Die Vol. 2 compilation.

Music highlights

2006–2007: Full Surface 
They appeared on numerous mixtapes, and released the street single "Boyz Iz Back". They have 2 new mixtapes, one released and the other under Big Mike & DJ Thoro, the first, Larsiny Put Ya L's In The Sky released on January 4, 2008, and the second, 100 Bars Mixtape (a.k.a. North Philly of Death) released on April 19, along with AR-AB's solo tapes Welcome To Trap Street and I See Dead People.

2008–2009: Larsiny Break-Up? 
In 2008, there was a beef brewing between Cassidy and Cal Akbar that was trying to be kept secret. Until in February 2009 various clips of Cal Akbar dissing Cassidy appeared on YouTube, resulting in a response track on Cassidy's Apply Pressure MixTape called "Dear Rodney (Akbar Diss)" and also Akbar's departure from the Larsiny group.

2009–present: Moving to Kross Over 
Cassidy took his Larsiny Family label over to Kross Over Entertainment and E1 Music with him, and released his fourth studio album titled C.A.S.H. .
In a 40-minute video speaking on the Meek Mill and Cassidy beef, Cousins Ar-Ab, Dark Lo though still on good terms with his former mentor, confirmed that he and OBH Ar Ab were no longer in Larsiny Family

MixTapes 
2008: Put Ya L's in the Sky (hosted by DJ Thoro)
2009: 100 Bars (North Philly of Death)

References

External links 
Official Larsiny MysPace page
Larsiny on MTV's Mixtape Monday

American hip hop groups
Rappers from Philadelphia